Esporte Clube Juventude, also known as Juventude, is a Brazilian football team in Caxias do Sul, Rio Grande do Sul. The club currently competes in the top tier of Brazilian football, the Série A, as well as in Campeonato Gaúcho Série A, the first level of the Rio Grande do Sul state football league. Major titles won by the club include the 1999 Copa do Brasil and the 1994 Campeonato Brasileiro Série B. Juventude also competes in the top tier state league of Rio Grande do Sul, having won it once, in 1998. Their greatest rival is Caxias, with whom it contests the Caxias do Sul derby, also known as CaJu.

History
Juventude was founded on June 29, 1913, by 35 youngsters from Caxias do Sul, descendants of Italian immigrants, being one of the first football clubs in that community. Antônio Chiaradia Neto was chosen as the club's first president.

On July 20, 1913, Juventude played its first game, against Serrano, from the city of Carlos Barbosa, Rio Grande do Sul. The game ended 4–0 in favor of Juventude.

On March 8, 1915, Juventude lost its first game ever. Fußball, from the nearby town of Montenegro, beat Juventude 4–1, ending a 23-game invincibility streak.

On October 10, 1919, Juventude joined the Rio Grande do Sul state football association

In 1920, the club became professional after signing some Uruguayan players.

On December 11, 1975, the first match against Caxias was played, which ended 1–0 to Juventude. The goal was scored by Da Silva. This match is known as the Ca-Ju derby.

On May 25, 1993, Juventude signed a partnership with Parmalat, bringing more investment to the club.

On December 4, 1994, Juventude won the second division of Campeonato Brasileiro, which was the first national title won by the club, gaining promotion to the first division.

On June 7, 1998, Juventude won the Campeonato Gaúcho without losing a single match.

On June 27, 1999, Juventude won its most important national title, the Copa do Brasil, gaining the right to contest the Copa Libertadores in the following year.

In 2000, Juventude played the Copa Libertadores for the first time, but the club was eliminated in the first stage.

Finally in 2013 Juventude finished Série D as 2nd and promoted to Série C for 2014 season. They ascended again to the Série B in 2017.

Juventude returned to the top division of Brazilian Football Série A after a 13-year absence by finishing 3rd in the 2020 Campeonato Brasileiro Série B. In 2021, they finished in 16th in the tournament, ensuring they remain in Série A for the 2022 championship.

Stadium

Juventude's stadium is Estádio Alfredo Jaconi, inaugurated in 1975, with a maximum capacity of 23,519 people.

Honours
Campeonato Brasileiro Série B: 1
1994

Copa do Brasil: 1
1999

Campeonato Gaúcho (State Championship): 1
1998

Copa FGF: 2
2011, 2012

Anthem
The club's official anthem lyrics were composed by Ernani Falcão, and the music by Rodolfo Storchi.

There is another anthem, which is an unofficial one, and was composed (both the lyrics and the music) by Paulo Gazola, and is called Hino da Volta do Ju, meaning Anthem of Ju's Return.

Current squad

Reserve team

Out on loan

Technical staff
Head Coach : Celso Roth
Assistant coach : Beto Ferreira, Lucas Zanella, Adaílton Bolzan
Fitness coach : Marcos Galgaro
Goalkeeping coach : Marcio Angonese
Physiologist : Marcos Galgaro
Nutritionist : Juliana Veber
Assistant Fitness Coach : Antônio Dal Pizzol
Development analyst : Antônio Macedo, Josué Romero, Luan Garcia
Club doctor : Michel Vigo, Rodrigo Zampieri, Alexandre Fay, Cristiano Raymondi
Physiotherapist : Ricardo Finger, Jean Michelon
Masseurs : Cleber Fernandes, Leonardo Zapello

References

External links
 Juventude Official website
Unofficial website

Esporte Clube Juventude
Association football clubs established in 1913
Football clubs in Rio Grande do Sul
Esporte Clube Juventude
Copa do Brasil winning clubs